Antabamba may refer to:

Antabamba, a town in Peru
Antabamba District, in the Antabamba province of Peru
Antabamba Province, in the Apurímac Region of Peru